Zvi Yair is the pen-name of the Hebrew poet and Chassidic scholar, Rabbi Zvi Meir Steinmetz (1915–2005). Zvi Yair was a Jewish poet who wrote in Hebrew.

Biography

His father Shlomo Dov Steinmetz lived in the village of Brister in the Carpathian Mountains, on the border of Galicia, but Zvi Yair was born in Budapest (1915), where the family was living temporarily because of the upheavals caused by the First World War.

In 1940 he married Devorah Isenberg and was hiding in Budapest during World War II thanks to a family friend, Eleonóra Sipos, which he later awarded a tree in the Yad Vashem museum.

After the war he lived in Vienna, Austria, till 1952 when he immigrated to New York. He began as a teacher in a Yeshiva University affiliated high school and then entered the real estate business as a mortgage broker and small investor.

Works
He published his first book, "Gesharim" [Bridges], (Herskovitz Miklós, Debrecen, Hungary) under the name Ben Shlomo [the son of Shlomo] in 1942 during World War II, and in 1951 he published in Vienna "Netiv" [Path].  He moved to New York and published a booklet in Israel in 1968 "Al Hachof" [On the Beach].  In 1973 he published "Merosh Zurim" (Eked, Tel Aviv), in 1981 "Miknaf Haaretz" (Eked, Tel Aviv) and in 1997 "Bechevion Hanefesh" (Heichal Menachem, Jerusalem).

External links
Official website
English Translations on Chabad.org

20th-century Hungarian rabbis
Hungarian Hasidic rabbis
American Hasidic rabbis
Chabad-Lubavitch rabbis
Jewish poets
Hebrew-language poets
American people of Hungarian-Jewish descent
Writers from Budapest
1915 births
2005 deaths
Pseudonymous writers